Alexander Wiseman MacAra  (4 May 1932 – 21 June 2012), also known as Sandy MacAra, was a Scottish professor of epidemiology at Bristol University and chairman of British Medical Association (BMA) from 1993 to 1998.

Early life 
Alexander Wiseman MacAra was born on 4 May 1932 in Irvine, North Ayrshire, Scotland. Both his father and grandfather were Church of Scotland Ministers.  Marion, his mother, was a civil servant. When he was six years old, MacAra was treated for paratyphoid fever, acute appendicitis and whooping cough.

MacAra was educated at Irvine Royal Academy. He studied at the Glasgow Medical School, Glasgow University, graduating with a medical degree in 1958. He went on to gain a DPH from the London School of Hygiene & Tropical Medicine in 1960.

Early career 
 1963 – 1997 Lecturer in Public Health, and later Consultant Senior Lecturer in Public Health, Bristol University
 1960s Founding member and subsequently Head of Department of Epidemiology and Public Health Medicine, Bristol University

Career 
From 1993 to 1998 MacAra was the chair of the ruling council of British Medical Association (BMA). He was consultant to the World Health Organisation (for over 20 years ), and he was president of the National Heart Forum. He was a member of the Council of the General Medical Council (GMC)

Campaigning 
MacAra played a key role in smoking ban in public places which was introduced in 2007. In 2009 he called for the MMR vaccine to be made compulsory following an unfounded health scare which resulted in a fall in the take up rate of the vaccine within the UK.

Honours 
MacAra was a Fellow of the Royal College of Physicians (FRCP). In 1992 he received an honorary degree- Honorary Doctor of Public Health, Athens.  He was created a Knight Bachelor in the 1998 Birthday Honours for services to the medical profession.

Personal life 
MacAra was married to Sylvia and they had two children, a daughter, Alexandra, and a son, James. He died on 21 June 2012.

Obituaries 

 British Medical Association (BMA) Link 1 Link 2
 BBC Link
 Scottish Herald Link
 The Telegraph
 The Guardian Link
 Bristol University Link
 Royal College of Physicians of Edinburgh (RCPE)
 Perspectives in Public Health (journal) Link

References

External links 
 BMJ profile
 

1932 births
2012 deaths
People from Irvine, North Ayrshire
People educated at Irvine Royal Academy
Alumni of the University of Glasgow
Academics of the University of Bristol
British public health doctors
Fellows of the Royal College of General Practitioners
Alumni of the London School of Hygiene & Tropical Medicine
Princeton University faculty
Knights Bachelor